Wild canary can refer to:
 The Atlantic canary (Serinus canaria), from which domestic canaries are descended
 Another name for the American goldfinch (Carduelis tristis)